UK-DMC 2 is a British Earth imaging satellite which is operated by DMC International Imaging. It was constructed by Surrey Satellite Technology, based on the SSTL-100 satellite bus. It is part of Britain's contribution to the Disaster Monitoring Constellation, which is coordinated by DMC International Imaging. It is the successor to the UK-DMC satellite.

Mission
UK DMC-2 was launched into a sun-synchronous low Earth orbit. The launch was conducted by ISC Kosmotras, using a Dnepr carrier rocket, with DubaiSat-1 being the primary payload. UK-DMC 2, along with the Deimos-1, Nanosat 1B, AprizeSat-3 and AprizeSat-4 satellites, were the rocket's secondary payload. The launch occurred at 18:46 GMT on 29 July 2009, with the rocket lifting off from Site 109/95 at the Baikonur Cosmodrome in Kazakhstan.

The satellite is also known as Blue Peter 1, and its construction and launch were followed by children's television.

References

Kids in Space from The National Archive

See also

UK-DMC 3
2009 in spaceflight
UK-DMC2 Mission pages from manufacturer SSTL

Spacecraft launched in 2009
Satellites of the United Kingdom
Earth imaging satellites
Spacecraft launched by Dnepr rockets